Gordon E. Snow (born September 22, 1946) is an American politician from Utah. A Republican, he was a member of the Utah State House, representing the state's 54th house district in Roosevelt from 1999 until his retirement in 2008. He served as the Majority Whip in the Utah House from 2006 to 2008.

Snow is a Latter-day Saint and a graduate of Utah State University.

References

1946 births
American Latter Day Saints
Living people
Republican Party members of the Utah House of Representatives
People from Roosevelt, Utah
Utah State University alumni
21st-century American politicians